Johnny Hamilton (10 July 1949 – 17 October 2015) was a Scottish professional football player who is best known for his time with Rangers and Hibernian.

Hamilton began his career with Cumbernauld United before moving on to Hibernian in 1969. He joined Rangers four years later. Hamilton also had spells with Millwall and St Johnstone. Hamilton died in October 2015, aged 66.

References

External links

1949 births
2015 deaths
Rangers F.C. players
Hibernian F.C. players
Millwall F.C. players
St Johnstone F.C. players
Association football midfielders
Scottish footballers
Scottish Football League players
English Football League players
Footballers from Glasgow
Cumbernauld United F.C. players